Rasmus Peetson (born 3 May 1995) is an Estonian professional footballer who plays as a midfielder for Meistriliiga club FCI Levadia and the Estonia national team.

International career
Peetson made his senior international debut for Estonia on 11 January 2019, in a 2–1 friendly win over Finland. On 19 November 2022 he scored his first goal for the national team, scoring the final goal in a 2-0 2022 Baltic Cup win against Lithuania.

Honours

Club
FCI Levadia
Meistriliiga: 2014, 2021
Estonian Cup: 2017–18
Estonian Supercup: 2015, 2018

References

External links

1995 births
Living people
Sportspeople from Pärnu
Estonian footballers
Association football midfielders
Esiliiga players
Meistriliiga players
FCI Levadia Tallinn players
Pärnu JK Vaprus players
Estonia youth international footballers
Estonia under-21 international footballers
Estonia international footballers
Pärnu Jalgpalliklubi players